The following is a list of the 25 municipalities (comuni) of the Province of Gorizia, Friuli-Venezia Giulia, Italy.

List

See also
List of municipalities of Italy

References

Istituto Nazionale di Statistica

Gorizia